Martin H. Foery (May 17, 1913 – June 4, 1994), was a United States Army major general born in Brooklyn, New York.  He served as the commanding general of 42nd Infantry Division "Rainbow Division" from 1963 to 1973.

Early years
Martin H. Foery was born in Brooklyn, New York in 1913.  He attended St. Johns Prep School (class of 1932) where he was Class President and participated in Dramatics and Track. He then attended St. Johns University (class of 1936) and graduated with a Bachelor of Science degree. While at St. John's University he was a member of the Track team and also served as Class Treasurer and Class President. He was also a member of the Omega Gamma Delta fraternity, Alpha Zeta chapter as well as the Skull and Circle Honor Society of St. John's University (New York). He was married to the late Kathryn E. Foery (née Shea) and they had four children.

Military career and background
Foery enlisted in the 165th Infantry (69th Infantry) Army National Guard in 1931. His first assignment was as a private with Company "A", 1st Battalion, 165th Infantry Regiment. He was promoted to corporal in 1933 and sergeant in 1934. He remained with Co. "A" until he was commissioned as a second lieutenant in 1938, when he was assigned to Company "D", 1st Battalion. In 1940 he was promoted to 1st lieutenant.

World War II
In 1941 the 165th was inducted into Federal service and was assigned to the U.S. Army 27th Infantry Division. At that time he was Executive Officer of Company "D", 1st Btn.

During World War II he served in the Pacific Theater  as company commander during the Marianas Campaign. In 1942 he was promoted to captain. He served as executive officer, and subsequently the commanding officer, of the 165th Inf., 3rd Battalion. He was promoted to major in 1943. He was cited for gallantry during the invasions of Makin in 1943 and Saipan in 1944. In July 1944 he was awarded the Silver Star, the nations 3rd highest military decoration for valor, during the Battle of Saipan (27th Infantry Div, GO 47 / 1944).

In addition, he was also awarded the Bronze Star Medal with Oak Leaf Cluster and "V" Device.

In 1945 he was promoted to lieutenant colonel. Due to a family medical hardship he was transferred stateside and subsequently assigned to a training regiment at the Army Ground Forces Replacement Depot at Fort George Meade, Maryland.

Post World War II
At the conclusion of World War II he left Federal service with the rank of lieutenant colonel. In 1947 he was assigned as the executive officer of the 165th Infantry Regiment. In 1949 he was promoted to colonel and was made the commanding officer of the 165th Infantry Regiment. Upon his promotion to commanding officer, he completed the military cycle from private to commander of the regiment he had joined eighteen years earlier. He was also a 1952 graduate of the United States Army Command and General Staff College.

In 1957 he was promoted to a federally recognized brigadier general. He served as assistant division commander of the 42nd Infantry Division from 1957 until 1963. In 1963 he was promoted to a federally recognized major general and was subsequently named commanding general by then New York State Governor Nelson A. Rockefeller. He served on the DOD Reserve Forces Policy Board from 1968 to 1971.

In March 1970 he mobilized the 42nd Infantry as part of Operation Graphic Hand to deliver U.S. Mail during the postal strike in New York.

In September 1973 he was awarded the Legion of Merit Medal.

In July 1973 he was awarded the New York State Conspicuous Service Medal, the 2nd highest military decoration of the New York State National Guard.

He retired from service in 1973.

Military published history and other information 

General Foery is noted in several published military works, including: "27th Infantry Division in World War II" by Captain Edmund G. Love; "D-Day in the Pacific: The Battle of Saipan" by Harold J. Goldberg; "Battling for Saipan" by Francis A. O'Brien; "The War in the Pacific: Campaign in the Marianas" by Philip A. Crowl; "Not a Gentleman's War: An Inside View of Junior Officers in the Vietnam War" By John R. Milam. He is also mentioned in "The National Guard in War: An Historical Analysis of the 27th Infantry Division (New York National Guard) in World War II" By Charles S. Kaune, MAJ, USA; and "Saipan: The Beginning of the End" by Major Carl W. Hoffman, USMC.

He is also listed under the Honorary Colonels of the (69th) Regiment.

Promotions

Awards and decorations
Foery's awards and decorations include the Silver Star, Legion of Merit, Bronze Star Medal with Oak Leaf Cluster and "V" Device, American Defense, American Campaign, Asiatic Pacific Campaign ( w/ two battle stars and Arrowhead device), World War II Victory, Combat Infantry Badge, Armed Forces Reserve (w/ Gold Hourglass device), New York State Conspicuous Service Medal, New York State Military Commendation, New York State Long & Faithful Service, New York State Conspicuous Service Cross, New York State Aid to Civil Authority Medal, Marksmanship Badge(W/ Rifle Bar) and Honorable Service Button.

Civilian career

In his civilian employment, Foery worked as a representative for Prudential Life Insurance Company. He died in June 1994.

References

1913 births
1994 deaths
United States Army personnel of World War II
United States Army generals
Recipients of the Silver Star
Recipients of the Legion of Merit